Gopal Singh Rathore (1872–1939), born in Rajasthan, was the ruler of the Kharwa state (near Ajmer) of Rajputana.

He was president of Akhil Bharatiya Kshatriya Mahasabha for the year 1924.

In 1989, India's postal department issued a postage stamp depicting his picture in his honor.

Every spring on the anniversary of his death, the residents of Kharwa and nearby villages gather at a mela (celebration or fair) to commemorate their former Thakur. He was a Rathore Rajput by birth and believed in upholding the duties of a Rajput ruler towards his people at all costs.

See also
Thakur Ganpat Singh

References

People from Rajasthan
1872 births
1939 deaths
Prisoners and detainees of British India
Indian revolutionaries
Indian royalty